Corbet is a small village and townland (of 618 acres) in County Down, Northern Ireland, 5 km east of Banbridge. It is situated in the civil parish of Magherally and the historic barony of Iveagh Lower, Lower Half. It lies within the Banbridge District. It had a population of 107 people (39 households) in the 2011 Census. (2001 Census: 95 people)

Places of interest
Corbet Lough is a reservoir and important angling lake with the 70 acre trout fishery controlled by Banbridge Angling Club. Facilities at the Lough include a boating dock and jetty and numerous fishing stands.
The River Bann also flows nearby.

The Great Northern Railway
Corbet railway station was on the extensive Great Northern Railway (Ireland) system.

The station was opened on 1 March 1880.

The station closed on 2 May 1955.  This action took place under the Ulster Transport Authority, cutting Newcastle, County Down from the rail network.

References 

Villages in County Down
Townlands of County Down
Civil parish of Magherally